is a Japanese role-playing video game developed by Birthday and published by Hudson Soft for Super Famicom, in December 1994 in Japan.

Gameplay 
In this game there are a series of natural disasters that are devastating the planet; causing the great Demon King Fattobajah (Fat Badger) to emerge from his elemental shell-induced slumber. A hero who carries a fire shell must save the world from a series of truly bad events. Up to ten playable characters can be used as allies in order to stop villains like Dr. Doan, Jalamar, Jodan, and Darkness Knight. The people who inhabit the land of Shelldorado are very smart despite looking like savage monsters.

There is a high level of random encounters in the game. Complex dungeon design can also be found in Daikaijū Monogatari that is typical of Japanese role-playing video games. While the main character and his allies factor into the storyline of the game, parts of the game seem to flow from the enemy's perspective more often.

When the player pauses the game, it normally leads to a series of eight options. Three more can be opened by virtue of a Pro Action Replay.

Manga 

 A part of Comic BomBom, DaiKaijuu Monogatari 1 was released for Manga in April 1995 in Japan, is based on the Videogame of Same Name.

Sequel
A sequel, was released August 1996 in Japan by the same developer and publisher.

References

External links
 Daikaijū Monogatari at Giant Bomb
 Daikaijū Monogatari at the Cutting Room Floor
 Daikaijū Monogatari at MobyGames

Super Nintendo Entertainment System games
Super Nintendo Entertainment System-only games
Role-playing video games
1994 video games
Hudson Soft games
Top-down video games
Fantasy video games
Japan-exclusive video games
Shōnen manga
Video games developed in Japan